Introducing TeeDee is the third studio album by Namibian kwaito musician and producer The Dogg. It was released by Mshasho Productions in May 2006, and was the first to be managed by KOOL Productions. The album introduced his alias TeeDee to his fans. This album is a replacing recording for his bootlegged album Mshasho Mos! which was supposed to be released in December 2005. Introducing TeeDee include revised songs which were intended to be released on the bootleg album. The album's first single "Baby Don't Go" released in 2005 was very successful in the Southern African region and its video won the award for best newcomer at the 2007 Channel-O Spirit of Africa Music Video Awards.

The album also saw The Dogg take a substantially more predominant production role, most of it was self-produced, with collaboration from Lucky Mereki and Jay Malgas co-producing half of it.

The title of the album's theme was to introduce TeeDee (The Dogg) to the international platform.

Track listing

References

2006 albums
The Dogg albums
Albums produced by the Dogg
Mshasho Productions albums